Continuity and Rupture: Philosophy in the Maoist Terrain is a 2016 book written by J. Moufawad-Paul. The book provides a philosophical analysis of the theoretical foundation of the Marxist school of thought developed by Chinese revolutionary Mao Zedong, Maoism.  Moufawad-Paul argues that the political ideology of Maoism, despite being formulated in the 1960s, only achieved full theoretical maturity in 1988 in Peru.

Synopsis
The book is introduced as an attempt by Moufawad-Paul to reclaim Maoism, as a contemporary political ideology and contest the negative conceptualizations by Trotskyists and Anarchists in the political left. For Moufawad-Paul, Maoism must be understood as being both a continuation of Leninist political, philosophical and strategic positions, while simultaneously, acting as a rupture from the dogmatic orthodoxy and theoretical limits of standard Marxism-Leninism, thus Maoism is characterized as both continuity and rupture. Throughout the work, Moufawad-Paul offers a critique of contemporary and historical Maoist organizations, such as The Revolutionary Communist Party USA, The Shining Path, The Naxalite insurgency in India, and The New People's Army, as well as contemporary Marxist intellectuals, Slavoj Zizek, Alain Badiou, and Tom Clark (author of State and Counter-Revolution).

The Terrain of Maoism-qua-Maoism
Moufawad-Paul premises his work on five axioms, which are introduced in chapter one:

 The distinction between "Mao Zedong Thought" and "Marxism–Leninism–Maoism" (what he calls "Maoism-qua-Maoism")
 Maoism, as a political ideology began in 1988 with the formation of The Communist Party of Peru, the first self-labelled Maoist party that conceived Maoism as a "third stage" of revolutionary science 
 Historical Materialism is a science due to its ability to explain historical phenomenon
 Maoism as a third stage of revolutionary science that is both a continuity and rupture from Marxism-Leninism
 To understand Maoism, one must understand the theoretical limitations of Marxism-Leninism.

Science's Dogmatic Shadow
In the second chapter, Moufawad-Paul introduces his argument that Marxism, in contrast to contemporary intellectual consensus, is not simply a philosophy, but a science, specifically Marx's theory of historical materialism.

The General Limits of Marxism-Leninism
In the third chapter, Moufawad-Paul discusses the inherent contradictions within the ideology of standard Marxism-Leninism. According to Moufawad-Paul, within a Marxist-Leninist Vanguard Party if understood through Lenin's What is to be Done?, is a party that represents the working class but is limited by the conception of "the general staff of the proletariat." Writing in response to Marxist writer Tom Clark's State and Counter Revolution, Moufawad-Paul concludes that the dialectical conflict between the working-class character of socialism and the petite-bourgeoisie character of the Vanguard Party is resolved through the application of the Maoist strategy of the mass line, wherein the Vanguard Party is further developed through the mass line.

A New Anti-Revisionism
In this chapter Moufawad-Paul defends the concept of Anti-Revisionism, which is an essential component of Maoist ideology, anti-revisionism is the Marxist position opposing alteration or "revision" of the established Marxist-Leninist ideology that had been developed in the Soviet Union following the death of Joseph Stalin (though Moufawad-Paul is also critical of Stalin's conception of Marxism-Leninism, treating it as a limit transgressed by Maoism). Moufawad-Paul defends this concept along using the logic of his conception of Maoism as a continuity of and rupture from Marxism-Leninism. 
Moufawad-Paul explains that any new conception of Anti-Revisionism must be understood within the dialectical interrelation between continuity and rupture within Maoism.

Maoism or Trotskyism
Continuity and Rupture contains an additional essay titled "Maoism or Trotskyism" which evaluates Maoism and Trotskyism as derivative forms of Leninism and their mutual claim to be the continuation of the Leninist political philosophy that led the October Revolution.

Reception

J. Moufawad-Paul's work received a positive reception among Marxist critics.

Historian Roxanne Dunbar-Ortiz and social activist Gabriel Kuhn both provide positive reviews of the book in the cover section.

Hamayon Rastgar in Marx and Philosophy gave a positive review of the book, writing, "Moufawad-Paul makes an appealing case for a return to the revolutionary kernel of communism through understanding the most contemporary stage of the development of the ideology and science of revolution, namely Maoism."

J. Moufawad-Paul's work received a negative reception among some circles of Maoist activists in the United States.

References 

Works about Maoism
Marxist theory
Books about Marxism
2016 non-fiction books
Shining Path
Contemporary philosophical literature
Naxalite–Maoist insurgency
Communist books
Books about revolutions
Books critical of capitalism
Philosophical literature
Zero Books
Maoist works